Auslogics Disk Defrag is a freemium software application for Microsoft Windows intended to defragment files and folders on a hard drive, consolidate free space and optimize file placement using different criteria. It is available in both a free and a proprietary "Pro" version with extended functionality.

As of February 2022, the free version is detected as a 'potentially unwanted program' by 5 anti-virus scanning engines.

Overview

Publisher
The program is published by Auslogics Software Pty Ltd, an Australian-based company specializing in maintenance software for computers that run the Microsoft Windows operating system. Starting in 2008, the company gained recognition for two products – Auslogics BoostSpeed and Auslogics Disk Defrag. In 2009 the company partnered with Sony Vaio to develop part of the Sony Vaio Care software. As of 2011, Auslogics has the Premier Elite Partner status in the Intel Software Partner Program.

History
Auslogics Disk Defrag was released in early 2007 as the first public non-beta version 1.1.2.208. It was free, gaining popularity as a substitute for the Windows standard defragmenter. The publisher has introduced multi-language support with over 10 million estimated users worldwide.

On February 1, 2012, the publisher released the professional version of Disk Defrag, with the free version remaining and differing from the new professional one in functionality. As of this date, the two versions of the application are given the names Auslogics Disk Defrag Professional and Auslogics Disk Defrag Free to differentiate them.

Program functions
Starting with file defragmentation in its earlier versions, Auslogics Disk Defrag expanded its capabilities to include free space defragmentation, optimization of file placement based on various criteria, ability to schedule defragmentation, defragment in the background, as well as a number of advanced functions in the professional version of the program.

Independent tests
From its first release in 2007, the program has been tested and reviewed by numerous software distribution and analysis editions, both online and in print. It received the highest 5-star rating from CNET, SuperShareware, and Editor's Choice award from Softpedia, Free Downloads Center, Download3K, TechSupportAlert.com and several other independent reviewers.
The program made CNET's Top 11 Downloads of 2011 in the Utilities and Operating Systems category – a chart put together by the online software distribution giant. It placed 11th with 2,227,034 downloads from CNET's website recorded between January 1 and December 12 of 2011. The application also made the Best Free Software of 2010 and 2011 lists compiled by PC Magazine.
The independent tests run by the experts from the above sources showed that Auslogics Disk Defrag could defragment well or better than most other similar applications reviewed. Among the program's advantages, the testers listed the following features:
 Availability of multiple defragmentation options
 Program's small size and fast performance
 The ease of use for an inexperienced customer
 The fact that the application is available for free for home use (Contains OpenCandy Adware)
The new professional edition of the application, Auslogics Disk Defrag Pro, since being released in early February 2012, has also been tested and reviewed by the main industry magazines and online authorities. It received 4.5 stars from the online software analysis and review publication Betanews. They note its configurability as one of its main advantages while listing the lack of local help as a disadvantage due to the program's manual being available only as an online download. Disk Defrag Professional was also reviewed by the major industry magazine PC Advisor, which called it a "very powerful defrag tool" and noted the program's many customization options as an advantage.

References

2007 software
Defragmentation software